This is a list of Members of Parliament (MPs) elected at the December 1910 general election, held over several days from 3 December to 19 December 1910.



MPs

Floor Crossings
See the List of British politicians who have crossed the floor

1914 William Edwin Harvey (Derbyshire North East) resigned the Labour whip and joined the Liberals.

1914 William Johnson (Nuneaton) resigned the Labour whip and joined the Liberals.

1915 John George Hancock (Derbyshire Mid) resigned the Labour whip and joined the Liberals.

1915 John Wadsworth (Hallamshire) resigned the Labour whip and joined the Liberals.

1915 William Abraham (Rhondda) resigned the Labour whip and joined the Liberals.

By-elections
See List of United Kingdom by-elections (1900–1918)

Sources

See also
December 1910 United Kingdom general election
List of parliaments of the United Kingdom

1910 12
December 1910 United Kingdom general election
 List
UK MPs